Alan MacKenzie Rattray was a lyricist and arranger of music. Born in Concord, Sydney in 1878, Rattray was the son of pioneer capitalists George Allan and Katherine Rattray.

Rattray was a prolific lyricist and arranger, often collaborating with fellow Australian composers Edward Tyrell and Lous L Howarde. Rattray is best known for the song "Boy in the Sailor Cap" which was the subject of a copyright claim 

He survived a shipwreck while on tour to India. Rattray was critical of Australian war time rationing, writing poetical polemics in the papers of the time.

He died in Paddington,  Sydney, in 1919

Works
 Boy in the Sailor Cap
 The Old Gum Tree performed most famously by Marie Eaton.
 On the Briny
 Jack Tar
 1908 Pansy Leaf
 Somebody's Sweetheart
 My Black Canary
 She's somebody's sweetheart still – words by Alan M. Rattray; the music by Alan M. Rattray & Clarence Vaughan
 Oh! Angeline! – written by Alan M. Rattray; music by Clarence Vaughan
 What would be a paradise to me – words by Alan M. Rattray; music by Alan M. Rattray and Clarence Vaughan
 Where the moonbeams bathe the fields in silver light – words by Alan M. Rattray; music by Clarence Vaughan
 Comic song: I'm not a long way off – written by Alan M. Rattray; composed by A.M.R., Clarence Vaughan
 We only live just to love – words by Alan M. Rattray; music by Clarence Vaughan
 A girl of the very best – music by Alan Rattray & Clarence Vaughan
 My heart keeps ever calling for her, still – words by Alan M. Rattray; music by Alan M. Rattray
 The girl in the Strand – words by Alan M. Rattray; music by Clarence Vaughan
 Sneezing song: Ah-h-did-did-did-ah-kshoo!!! – words by Alan M. Rattray; music by Clarence Vaughan
 Only a little boy – words by Alan M. Rattray; music by Clarence Vaughan
 My maid of Tyrol – words by Alan M. Rattray; music by AMR & Clarence Vaughan
 Suzanne! – words by Alan M. Rattray; music by Clarence Vaughan
 When my sweetheart answered yes – words by Alan M. Rattray; music by AMR & Clarence Vaughan
 Comic song: Joints – written by Alan M. Rattray; music by Clarence Vaughan
 Comic song: Kickin' up a fuss like that! – written by Alan M. Rattray; composed by Clarence Vaughan
 The idol of Cassidy's ball – words by Alan M. Rattray; arranged by Clarence Vaughan
 Sister! – words by Alan M. Rattray; music by Clarence Vaughan
 Then he began to think – words by Aln M. Rattray; music by Clarence Vaughan
 My first and only love – words by Alan M. Rattray; arranged by Clarence Vaughan
 I wonder what they mean by that – words by Alan M. Rattray; music by AMR & Clarence Vaughan
 That's French! – words by Alan Rattray; music by Clarence Vaughan
 My Sunday boy – words by Alan M. Rattray; music by A.M.R. & Clarence Vaughan
 Comic duet: Think o' that! – words by Alan M. Rattray; music by Benj. H. Burt
 The way they love – written and composed by Alan M. Rattray; arranged by Louis L. Howarde
 Miss Penelope – words by Alan M. Rattray; music by Clarence Vaughan
 If your love were real – words and music by Alan M. Rattray; arranged by Louis L. Howarde
 Comic song: What a pity – written and composed by Alan M. Rattray; arranged by L. L. Howarde
 Love in all
 What does it matter when two – Alan M. Rattray & Clarence Vaughan
 Little Grey Eyes – words and music by Alan M. Rattray; arranged by L. L. Howarde
 I'm so tired of waiting for you – words and music by Alan M. Rattray; arranged by L. L. Howarde
 Laughing answers – written by Alan M. Rattray; composed & arranged by Alan M. Rattray & L. L. Howarde
 Lavinia : schottische – composed by Alan M. Rattray.
 Dear old dad – words and music by Alan M. Rattray; arranged by L.L. Howarde
 Ambolene, ma Kaffir queen – words & music by Alan M. Rattray
 Coster song: Sal – words and music by Alan M. Rattray; arranged by Louis L. Howarde
 The boy in the sailor cap – words and music by Alan M. Rattray; arranged by Louis L. Howarde
 Mabel – words and music by Alan M. Rattray; arranged by Louis L. Howarde
 I'm such a tomboy – words and music by Alan M. Rattray; (arr. by Louis L. Howarde)
 Eily – words and music by Alan M. Rattray (arranged by Louis L. Howarde)
 Schottische – Comic song: I don't care – written and composed by Alan M. Rattray; arranged by L.L. Howarde
 Jack Tar – words and music by Alan M. Rattray; arranged by Louis L. Howarde
 Gymnastic scena: The girls from Sandow's school – written by Alan M. Rattray; composed by Alan M. Rattray and Lou. L. Howarde
 False as accused – written and composed by Alan Rattray & Tom Donnelly
 It only makes me love you more and more – words and music by Alan M. Rattray

Recordings
 1905: "Sister"

References

1878 births
1919 deaths
19th-century Australian male musicians
19th-century composers
20th-century Australian male musicians
20th-century composers
Australian composers
Australian male composers
Australian musical theatre composers
Male musical theatre composers